Maharaja Nripendra Narayan (4 October 1862 – 18 September 1911) was the Maharaja of the princely state of Cooch Bihar, India, from 1863 to 1911.

Early life
Nripendra Narayan was only ten months old when his father, Narendra Narayan, died in 1863. He was crowned maharaja in the same year. Since he was still an infant, the administration was handed over to the commissioner appointed by the British Governor General. His elder brother became the Raja of Chitaranjan and Rupnarayanpur, the land of their ancestors. He studied at Wards Institute at Benaras, thereafter, at Bankipur College, Patna and lastly law at Presidency College, Calcutta. In 1878 he married Suniti Devi, a daughter of Keshab Chandra Sen of Calcutta. Immediately after marriage, he left for England for higher studies.

Family
He was the father of four sons and three daughters: sons Rajendra Narayan, Jitendra Narayan, Victor Nityendra Narayan, and Hitendra Narayan, and daughters Pratibha Devi, Sudhira Devi, and Sukriti Devi.

Of his sons, Rajendra and Jitendra later became Maharajas of Cooch Behar. Gayatri Devi and Ila Devi were daughters of his son Jitendra.

His eldest daughter, Sukriti (Princess Garlie), was married to Josnya Nath Ghosal the nephew of the Nobel laureate poet Rabindranath Tagore. Jitendra Narayan was married to Princess Indira Devi of Baroda. 
His second daughter Prativa Sundari Devi married English actor, film director and author Miles Mander in 1912.
 
His third daughter Sudhira Sundari Devi married in 1914 Alan Mander, brother of Miles.

Death
Nripendra died at the English coastal resort of Bexhill-on-Sea in September 1911. His funeral took place in Bexhill on 21 September 1911. The Maharajah had come to Bexhill to convalesce after leaving Moor Hall, Ninfield. One of his daughters had recently drowned. 
A memorial drinking fountain dedicated to Nripendra was opened by his second son, Maharaja Kumar Jitendra on 18 September 1913 (jitendra has just succeeded to the throne of Cooch Behar after the death of his older brother Rajendra). The fountain originally stood to the side of the Coastguards Cottages on the present site of the De La Warr Pavilion. When the cottages were demolished in 1934 to make way for the Pavilion, the fountain was re-erected in Egerton Park. It stood near to the park entrance next to the Bexhill Museum until 1963, when it was removed for restoration. It was stored in Bexhill Cemetery for a while but then subsequently disappeared. Its current whereabouts is unknown.

Bexhill-on-Sea's historical society has produced a booklet "Bexhill's maharajah" summarising Nripendra's connections with Bexhill.

Work

He banned the practice of slave-keeping (Kritadas Pratha) in his State by introducing a law in 1884. In the year 1888, for the betterment of higher studies in his own state, he established the Victoria College now known as A.B.N. Seal College. Further, in the name of his queen, Suniti Devi, he set up a girls school called Suniti College in 1881 which was later named Suniti Academy. In 1883 he constructed the Nripendra Narayan Hall in Jalpaiguri city and in 1887 granted land for the construction of the Lowis Jubilee Sanitarium in Darjeeling. He also established the India Club at Calcutta in 1882. He also established the Anandamayi Dharmasala for distribution of free foods for poor at Cooch Behar in 1889. He founded in Cooch Behar, the botanical garden – Narendra Narayan Park in 1892. He was also the first president of Calcutta Club founded in 1907.

Maharaja was a great enthusiast of cricket and promoted Cooch Behar team and would invite top quality players from all over the world. He had a cricket ground at his palace in Cooch Behar and also promoted one ground at Alipore in Calcutta. His team and team of Maharaja of Natore were rivals in cricket in Bengal. He was also an enthusiast of football in Bengal as one of the supporters of Mohun Bagan.

Honours

Empress of India Medal Gold-1877 with a Sword.
Knight Grand Commander of the Order of the Indian Empire (GCIE)-1887
Queen Victoria Golden Jubilee Medal-1887
Queen Victoria Diamond Jubilee Medal Clasp-1897
Delhi Durbar Gold Medal-1903

Memorials

The Nripendra Narayan Memorial High School is named after him, which was founded by his son, Maharaja Jitendra Narayan, in his memory in 1916.

See also
 List of famous big game hunters

Notes

References
 The Maharajah of Cooch Behar; Thirty-Seven Years of Big Game Shooting in Cooch Behar, the Duars, and Assam. Bombay, The Times Press, 1908.

1862 births
1911 deaths
Bengali Hindus
20th-century Bengalis
19th-century Bengalis
Companions of the Order of the Bath
Founders of Indian schools and colleges
Hindu monarchs
Knights Grand Commander of the Order of the Indian Empire
Maharajas of Koch Bihar
Indian knights
Indian philanthropists
People from Bexhill-on-Sea
Indian educators
20th-century Indian educators
19th-century Indian educators
Educationists from India
Bengali educators
Indian educational theorists
19th-century Indian educational theorists
20th-century Indian educational theorists
Indian social workers
Indian reformers
Indian social reformers
Educators from West Bengal
Social workers from West Bengal
People from Cooch Behar